Sanjida Preeti is a Bangladeshi actress, model, dancer, make-up artist & set designer etc. She was born in Dhaka, Bangladesh.

Personal life 
Preeti is the youngest among five siblings. She married Jibran in 2014. He is cousin of film hero Nayeem.

Career 
Preeti started her acting career through the theater and later acted in Sporsher Baire, Kachher Manush, Doll's House, Poush Faguner Pala and single drama such as Nil Ushnotai Kadi, Ebong Bonolata Sen, Drishti Dan in television. She is an actor in Prachyanat Natok theatre group and has acted in Koinna, Punorjonmo, etc.

Works

Drama serial 
 Sporsher Baire
 Kacher Manush (2006)
 Doll's House
 Poush Faguner Pala
 Baburchiana (2018)
 Aynabaji Original Series(2017)
 Rup
 Dugdugi
 Brihospoti Tunge
Sayankal (সায়ংকাল)

Single drama 
 Valobashi Tai Valobeshe Jai
 Nil Ushnotai Kadi
 Ebong Bonolata Sen
 Drishti Dan
 Bakbakum Valobasha
 Bodle Jawar Golpo
 ব্যালকনি
 Jolmanob
 Kolmilota
 Color Full (2017)
 Happiness (2017)
 Bodhu Miche Raag Korona (2018)
 Surface (2020)
 Achor (2018)
 Jahanara Er Akti Bhai Chilo
 অন্য সকাল
 Golmal
 পাতকি
 খোলসবন্দী
Aguner Maye (আগুনের মেয়ে)

Films
1971 Ei Shob Din (Upcoming)
Mridha Vs Mridha (2022)

Web series
 Taqdeer (2020)

References 

Living people
People from Dhaka
Bangladeshi actresses
Best TV Actress Meril-Prothom Alo Critics Choice Award winners
Year of birth missing (living people)
North South University alumni